Tibradden or Tibradden Station is a pastoral lease that currently operates as a cattle station and had previously operated as a sheep station.

The name Tibradden is taken from the name of an estate in Ireland near Dublin.

The property comprising  had been established in 1852 and was owned by John S. Davis, J. P. Walcott and M. Logue, who dissolved their partnership in 1854.

The property was running sheep in 1875 and was selling breeding ewes and rams.

See also
List of ranches and stations

References

Pastoral leases in Western Australia
Stations (Australian agriculture)
Mid West (Western Australia)
1852 establishments in Australia